Lijia is a town in Wujin District, Changzhou, Jiangsu province, China. , it administers the following three residential communities and 14 villages:
Lijia Community
Banshang Community
Zhengping Community
Lijia Village
Banshang Village
Zhengping Village
Xinchen Village
Qinxiang Village
Jiandong Village
Luzhuang Village
Maojia Village
Heshu Village
Pu'an Village
Wuyang Village
Pangjiajie Village
Huadu Village
Dalu Village

References

Township-level divisions of Jiangsu
Changzhou